Villatico is a frazione of the comune of Colico, Lombardy, northern Italy.

Documents dating from 1239 prove the existence of a mill located in Villatico.
After a flood in 1496 destroyed the town of St. George (now Colico Piano), Villatico became the largest town in the Colico area. Meanwhile, devotion for St. Bernardino of Siena, known for curing the plague victims.
In the 18th century, after the plague ended, the first harbor built in the town and Colico Piano became increasingly important.

Sights include the church of San Bernardino of Siena.

Notable people from Villatico
 Maria Laura Mainetti, Roman Catholic nun and victim of a satanic human sacrifice, who was declared a martyr and subsequently beatified

Bibliography 
Giovanni Del Tredici, Elena Fattarelli, Colico e il Monte Legnone – Sentieri e Storia, CAI Colico, 2007

See also 
Colico
Curcio
Laghetto
Olgiasca

Frazioni of the Province of Lecco
Colico

it:Colico#Villatico